Nocardioides aquaticus is a species of Gram-positive, non-motile, aerobic bacteria.

References

Further reading

External links

LPSN
Type strain of Nocardioides aquaticus at BacDive -  the Bacterial Diversity Metadatabase

aquaticus
Bacteria described in 2000